Caballero (meaning Gentleman in English) was a magazine for men published in Mexico City. It existed between 1966 and 1997. Raymundo Ampudia was its director.

References

Defunct magazines published in Mexico
Magazines established in 1966
Magazines disestablished in 1997
Mass media in Mexico City
Men's magazines published in Mexico
Spanish-language magazines
1966 establishments in Mexico
1997 disestablishments in Mexico